Dnepr may refer to:

Dnieper, a river flowing through Russia, Belarus and Ukraine to the Black Sea
Dnepr (motorcycle), a Ukraininan motocycle brand
Dnepr (rocket), a 1999 space launch vehicle
Dnepr radar, Soviet space surveillance and early warning radar

See also
Dnieper (disambiguation)
Dnipro (disambiguation)